A guz or the Mughal yard is a unit of length used in parts of Asia. Historically, it was a regionally variable measurement similar to the English yard both in size and in that it was often used for measuring textiles. Today, it is generally used in the Indian subcontinent as the word for a yard. A present day sari is still measured as 7 guz while a traditional one can be as long as 9 guz.

History
Use of the guz in India was first established during the Mughal Empire. The guz in Rajasthan at the end of the 17th century was quoted as being .

By the 20th century, the guz was uniformly quoted as being equal in length to one yard in the English system, or 0.91 metres in the metric system. But there are some different values still in use, like Bikaner has 1 guz/gaz = 2 ft officially recognized and in use.  

The guz is still commonly used in the Indian subcontinent.  It has become the standard word in Hindi and Urdu for "yard".

Name
The word also is reputed to have given the Royal Navy base at HMNB Devonport, in Plymouth, the affectionate nickname of "Guzz", as sailors referring to the Dockyard, used to regularly abbreviate the word to simply "The Yard", leading to the slang use of the Hindi word for the unit of measurement of the same name.

Regional definitions

Arabia

Persia

Nepal

Southeast Asia

References

Further reading 

Units of length
Customary units in India
Obsolete units of measurement